The Old Bartow County Courthouse built in 1869 is an historic stately redbrick Italianate style building located at 4 East Church Street in Cartersville, Bartow County, Georgia, United States. Built as Bartow County's second courthouse and the first in Cartersville, it proved to be unsatisfactory because court proceedings had to be halted while trains passed by on the nearby railroad. It was replaced in 1902 by the third Bartow County Courthouse located nearby. The building was then either vacant or used as a warehouse until December 2010 when it became the Bartow History Museum.

References

External links
 Bartow History Museum

Courthouses on the National Register of Historic Places in Georgia (U.S. state)
Italianate architecture in Georgia (U.S. state)
Government buildings completed in 1869
Buildings and structures in Bartow County, Georgia
Former county courthouses in Georgia (U.S. state)
1869 establishments in Georgia (U.S. state)
National Register of Historic Places in Bartow County, Georgia